The citrate-malate shuttle is a series of chemical reactions – commonly referred to as a biochemical cycle or system – that transports acetyl-CoA in the mitochondrial matrix across the inner and outer mitochondrial membrane for fatty acid synthesis. Mitochondria, also known as the powerhouse of a cell, is enclosed in a double membrane. As the inner mitochondrial membrane is impermeable to acetyl-CoA, the shuttle system is essential to fatty acid synthesis in the cytosol. It plays an important role in the generation of lipids in the liver (hepatic lipogenesis).

The name of the citrate-malate shuttle is derived from the two intermediates – short lived chemicals that are generated in a reaction step and consumed entirely in the next – citrate and malate that carry the acetyl-CoA molecule across the mitochondrial double membrane.

The citrate-malate shuttle is present in humans and other higher eukaryotic organisms, and is closely related to the Krebs cycle. The system is responsible for the transportation of malate into the mitochondrial matrix to serve as an intermediate in the Krebs cycle, and the transportation of citrate into the cytosol for secretion in aspergillus niger, a fungi used in the commercial production of citric acid.

Mechanism

Structure of mitochondria 
All cells need the energy to survive. Mitochondria is a double-membrane structure in the body cell that generates and transports essential metabolic products. The 3 layers of this structure are the outer membrane, intermembrane space and inner membrane. The space inside the mitochondria is called the mitochondrial matrix, while the region outside is the cytosol. The outer membrane allows most small molecules to pass through. In contrast, the inner membrane transports specific molecules only, which is impermeable to many substances. Therefore, a shuttle is required for the transportation of molecules across the inner membrane. It acts as a pump to drive the substances from the inner membrane to the outside.

Component of system 
On the surface of cells, there are many proteins. Some proteins are involved in recognition, attachment or transportation. The citrate malate shuttle system consists of citrate shuttle and malate shuttle, which are carrier proteins. Carrier proteins present on cell surface. They transport different molecules across the mitochondria. In this system, the substances being transported are malate and citrate.

The starting material is Acetyl-CoA . It is a molecule that is involved in ATP synthesis, protein metabolism, and lipid metabolism. As the inner membrane is not permeable to this molecule, Acetyl-CoA needs to be converted into other products for effective transport. It is also the first step of the reaction.

Movement of citrate and malate 
The reaction occurs in 2 sites - cytosol and mitochondria matrix. There are 6 major steps in this pathway.
In the beginning, the acetyl group of Acetyl-CoA combines with oxaloacetate to form citrate, releasing the coenzyme group (CoA) in the mitochondrial matrix. In the second step, citrate would bind to citrate transporters. The shuttle delivers citrate from the inner membrane to the intermembrane space. Then, there is a net movement of citrate from intermembrane space to the cytosol across the outer membrane, following the concentration gradient, i.e. from a region of higher citrate concentration to that of lower citrate concentration. After the citrate is transported out, it is broken down into the original reactants. Using ATP as energy, citrate is broken down into the acetyl group and oxaloacetate. The acetyl group would join the coenzyme in the cytosol, forming acetyl-CoA.

Moreover, oxaloacetate is reduced by NADH to malate in the cytosol, releasing free electrons. Malate would be transported by the malate shuttle, moving from cytosol to matrix. It is a highly efficient transport system. At last, the malate is oxidized by NAD+ (the oxidizing agent) to oxaloacetate again, releasing NADH. The replenishment of oxaloacetate can be achieved. The oxaloacetate can react with the Acetyl-CoA in the first step, completing a cycle.

The shuttle system is closely associated with body lipid metabolism, such as fatty acid production, break down of glucose and oxidation of fat. The products would react with other molecules in the cells. It can link to another energy production cycle - Krebs cycle.

Steps 

Table 1: Summary of the Reactants and Products involved in 6 Steps of the Citrate-Malate-Shuttle System

The table shows the overall processes and chemical molecules present in the 6 major steps, including their location in cells. A cycle is formed by the system, ensuring that the conversion between Acetyl-CoA, oxaloacetate, citrate and malate can continue itself without the need of foreign molecules addition.

Function 
The citrate-malate shuttle allows the cell to produce fatty acid with excess acetyl-CoA for storage. The principle is similar to that of insulin, which turns excess glucose in the body to glycogen for storage in the liver cells and skeletal muscles, so that when there is a lack of energy intake, the body could still provide itself with glucose by breaking down glycogen. The citrate-malate shuttle enables more compact storage of chemical energy in the body in the form of fatty acid by transporting acetyl-CoA into the cytosol for fatty acid and cholesterol synthesis. The lipids produced can then be stored, so that they can be used in the future.

Acetyl-CoA is generated in the mitochondrial matrix from two sources: pyruvate decarboxylation in glycolysis and break down of fatty acids through β-oxidation, which are both essential pathways of energy production in human. Pyruvate decarboxylation is the step that connects glycolysis and the Krebs cycle regulated by the pyruvate dehydrogenase complex when blood glucose level is high. Otherwise, fatty acid β-oxidation occurs and acetyl-CoA is required to generate ATP through the Krebs cycle. In a subject with defective citrate-malate shuttle, acetyl-CoA in mitochondria cannot exit into the cytosol. Fatty acid synthesis is hence hindered and the body would not be able to store excess energy as efficiently as a normal subject.

In addition, improper functioning of the citrate-malate shuttle can result in disruption of Krebs cycle.

Linkage to Krebs cycle 

Krebs cycle – also known as the TCA cycle or Citric acid cycle – is a biochemical pathway that facilitates the break down of glucose in a cell. Both citrate and malate involved in the citrate-malate shuttle are necessary intermediates of the Krebs cycle. Usually oxaloacetate in the Krebs cycle is generated from carboxylation of pyruvate in the mitochondrion, however malate generated in the cytosol can also enter the mitochondrion through the transport protein located in the inner mitochondrial membrane to directly join the Krebs cycle.

The mitochondrial transport proteins are encoded by the SLC25 gene in humans and facilitates the transportation of various metabolites, including citrate and malate in the Krebs cycle. These transport proteins control the flow of metabolites in and out of the inner mitochondrial membrane that is impermeable to most molecules. They connect carbohydrate metabolism of the Krebs cycle to fatty acid synthesis in lipogenesis by catalyzing the transportation of acetyl-CoA out of the mitochondrial matrix into the cytosol, which is done in the form of citrate export from the mitochondria to cytosol. Cytosolic citrate, meaning citrate in the cytosol, is a key substrate for the generation of energy. It releases acetyl-CoA and provides NADPH for fatty acid synthesis and in subsequent pathways generates NAD+ for glycolysis. Citrate also activates acetyl-CoA carboxylase, an enzyme that is essential in the fatty acid synthesis pathway.

Citrate-malate shuttle might partly or completely replace the function of Krebs cycle in cancer cell metabolism.

Association to cancer

Alternate metabolic pathway in cancer cell 

Recent study proposed that the citrate-malate shuttle may contribute to sustaining cancer cells through a β-oxidation-citrate–malate shuttle metabolic pathway. In normal cells, β-oxidation produces acetyl-CoA which enters the Krebs cycle to produce ATP, and β-oxidation cannot continue if the Krebs cycle is impaired and acetyl-CoA accumulates. However, cancer cells may carry out continuous β-oxidation by connecting it to the citrate-malate shuttle. The new metabolic pathway consists of mitochondrial transport proteins and several enzymes, including ATP-citrate lyase (ACLY) and malate dehydrogenases 1 and 2 (MDH1 and MDH2). The proposed metabolic pathway may explain the Warburg effect – that cancer cells produce energy through a suboptimal pathway – and hypoxia in cancer.

The energy efficiency of this pathway is 3.76 times less than the normal β-oxidation Krebs cycle pathway, only producing 26 moles instead of 98 moles of ATP from 1 mole of palmitate.

It is still unsure whether this pathway exists in cancer cells. Factors preventing this pathway from occurring includes lipotoxicity of palmitate and stearate.

Liver cancer

Role of liver 
The liver contains metabolic active tissues as it is responsible for detoxification, protein and carbohydrate metabolism. Therefore, It needs a lot of energy to function and contains abundant mitochondria. Any abnormalities in mitochondria would affect liver metabolism. If the liver does not work properly, it may produce excess metabolites, leading to accumulation; in contrast, it may also fail to produce certain chemicals. As a result, the imbalance of metabolites may lead to liver cancer development, i.e. hepatocarcinogenesis.

Cancer cells 
The growth and development of normal cells follow a cycle in a controlled and ordered manner. When they are damaged, they will die through a process called apoptosis. However, apoptosis is disrupted in cancer cells, allowing them to divide and grow uncontrollably, potentially invading other tissues or organs. They will not undergo the normal death process of body cells.

Hepatocellular carcinoma (HCC) is a prevalent type of liver cancer that accounts for over 80% of cases. It is lethal cancer due to the remarkable drug tolerance, spread potential and high chance of relapse. Scientists have carried out many kinds of research in finding out the risk factors of HCC progression.

Risk factors 
Metabolic disorder is one of the causes of liver cancer. Mitochondria is responsible for oxidation using NAD+, which is produced in Step 4 of the citrate-malate shuttle system. In high obesity or insulin resistance (diabetes) patients, their body contains large amounts of fatty acid, the shuttle system might not generate sufficient NAD+ to metabolize the fat efficiently. They also exhibit a low NAD+ level. Thus, it is more likely for obesity or diabetes patients to develop liver cancer.

Moreover, overloading of mitochondria may occur. There is an increase in reactive oxygen species level in the liver. Those species are highly reactive and would attack liver cells. They can damage the DNA strands. Cells with DNA damage may divide abnormally. They might grow into cancer cells, resulting in HCC.

Another risk factor is mutations and overexpressed citrate-malate shuttle. A high frequency mutated gene in a wide range of cancers, Ras oncogene, has a significantly close association to HCC. Many HCC patients carry this gene. They also have abnormal citrate-malate shuttle. The research of Dalian Medical University shows that there is a noticeable increase in the HCC patients’ citrate and malate levels, suggesting the possibility of higher activity of citrate-malate shuttle. This mechanism is effective when TCA cycle activity is low. The shuttle also helps the production of fatty acid and lactic acid.

In liver cancer cells, the TCA cycle is blocked, causing accumulation of excess pyruvate. It is a signal of the body defense mechanism. Normally, the cancer cells would die under a high pyruvate level. However, the overexpressed citrate-malate shuttle can remove the excessive pyruvate. In this situation, the natural cell death of liver tumor will not occur. The cancer cells can keep growing.

In addition, high shuttle activity is linked to increase in fatty acid generation. It is also a risk factor of HCC.

Genetics and evolution

Mitochondrial diseases 
Mitochondrial diseases are usually caused by mutation in mitochondrial DNA. These genes regulate different proteins synthesis, including carrier proteins and certain enzymes.

The replication of mitochondrial DNA follows binary fission. In this process, 1 set of genes would divide into 2 sets. The mitochondrial gene of children is inherited from their mother only. If there are any genetic defects or mutations in the mother’s mitochondrial DNA, it would be inherited by the children. If those changes in genes can cause mitochondrial diseases, the children have a 100% possibility of acquiring the diseases.

For the malate-oxaloacetate shuttle, 4 major genes are involved. They are PMDH1, MDH, PMDH2, mMDH1. PMDH-1 and PMDH-2 encode two different enzymes that provide NAD+ for the oxidation of malate. In addition, MDH and mMDH1 encode for an enzyme that directly oxidizes malate.

Importance 

SLC25 is a gene that is essential for the synthesis of a wide range of mitochondrial transporters, such as citrate shuttle. Mutations in this gene can result in dysfunctional mitochondria. This leads to significant decrease in the energy production of our body cells, causing severe metabolic diseases. It can cause severe symptoms in organs or tissues that have high energy demand. These organs include the liver, brain, heart, kidneys. They require abundant functional mitochondria to function. Mitochondrial disorders caused by defective or reduced SLC25 gene expression can cause diseases, such as CAC deficiency, HHH syndrome, AGC2 deficiency (CTLN2/NICCD), adPEO, Congenital Amish microcephaly, Early epileptic encephalopathy, AAC1 deficiency, PiC (isoform A) deficiency, AGC1 deficiency, Neuropathy with striatal necrosis, and Congenital sideroblastic anaemia.

In addition, SLC25 gene is crucial for the survival of the organisms because of its high frequency in the genomics of different organisms. It indicates that this gene is favourable for the survival of a species in response to the environmental features, so it is preserved and passed along the generation. In other words, the gene is positively selected for evolution. Not only is SLC25 gene found in humans, but also in other animals, or even microorganisms like bacteria and viruses. It shows that this gene is conserved among different species. This might provide evidence for the significance and essentialness of the gene in the survival of organisms.

References 

Metabolism
Citric acid cycle